Martin Johnsrud Sundby (born 26 September 1984) is a former Norwegian cross-country skier who competed between 2003 and 2021. He is a two time Olympic champion at the 2018 Winter Olympics in the team sprint and relay and was also a silver and bronze medalist in the 30 km skiathlon in 2014 and 2018. Sundby is a 4-time world champion, winning his sole individual gold medal at the 15 km at the 2019 Nordic World Ski Championships in Seefeld. In 2014, he became the first Norwegian to win the Tour de Ski, a feat he repeated in 2016. He also won the overall world cup in 2014, 2016 and 2017.

Career
Sundby got his international breakthrough when he won his first individual victory on 30 November 2008 in Kuusamo,  Finland. The victory was regarded as a major surprise, despite Sundby delivering several solid displays in earlier races. At lower levels,  Sundby has won a junior sprint event in 2003, a 30 km Scandinavian Cup race in 2007, and a 10 km FIS race in 2007. He later won the team sprint event at the test event in Liberec, Czech Republic on 17 February 2008.

Sundby and compatriot Therese Johaug became the first Norwegians to win the Tour de Ski when they won the men's and women' competitions in the 2013–14 edition of the race. Sundby subsequently won the overall and distance competitions in the 2013–14 FIS Cross-Country World Cup. He also won the 2016 Tour de Ski. In addition to his Tour de Ski victories, Sundby won the inaugural Ski Tour Canada, despite starting behind Sergey Ustiugov and Petter Northug on the final stage.

Doping violation
In January 2015 Norwegian Ski Federation "was informed that Johnsrud Sundby had crossed the legal limit, the so called 'decision limit', in regard to the use of" [salbutamol trademarked as] Ventolin; the federation should have acted then, is the opinion of Fredrik Aukland, NRK's expert on crosscountry skiing.

On 20 July 2016 Johnsrud Sundby was banned from competition for two months by the Court of Arbitration for Sport (CAS) for an anti-doping rule violation. His use of asthma medication salbutamol, resulted in test levels of urine sample, exceeding the very high 1000 ng/ml limits set in the anti-doping rules by 35% for two samples collected in competition, on 13 December 2014 and 8 January 2015. The facts of the case were undisputed and the decision focused on the meaning of the term "inhaled salbutamol", specifically whether the 1600 μg per day limit referred to the "labelled dose" or the "delivered dose". The CAS panel decided that the intended meaning was the former, but criticised the drafting of the rule. For this and other reasons, including that Johnsrud Sundby declared salbutamol at the time of the test, the panel found his degree of fault light and opted for a short sanction. As the tests were taken in competition, the two results were automatically stripped. This led to Johnsrud Sundby losing the 2015 Tour de Ski title and the overall world cup title for the 2014–15 season. Apart from the subsequent stages of the 2015 Tour de Ski, no other results were affected. His short suspension took place in summer months outside the competitive skiing season.

At a 21 October 2016 national convention of  Norwegian Ski Federation (NSF), some of the local representatives had a critical view on the federation having compensated Johnsrud Sundby for his loss of prize money due to his breaking the rules against doping.

Cross-country skiing results
All results are sourced from the International Ski Federation (FIS).

Olympic Games
 5 medals – (2 gold, 2 silver, 1 bronze)

World Championships
 9 medals – (4 gold, 3 silver, 2 bronze)

World Cup

Season titles
 6 titles – (3 overall, 3 distance)

Season standings

Individual podiums
 30 victories (19 , 11 ) 
 74 podiums (43 , 31 )

Team podiums
 14 victories (13 , 1 ) 
 18 podiums (17 , 1 )

References

External links

 
 
 
 

1984 births
Living people
Skiers from Oslo
Norwegian male cross-country skiers
Cross-country skiers at the 2010 Winter Olympics
Cross-country skiers at the 2014 Winter Olympics
Cross-country skiers at the 2018 Winter Olympics
Olympic cross-country skiers of Norway
Olympic gold medalists for Norway
Olympic silver medalists for Norway
Olympic bronze medalists for Norway
Olympic medalists in cross-country skiing
Doping cases in cross-country skiing
Norwegian sportspeople in doping cases
FIS Nordic World Ski Championships medalists in cross-country skiing
FIS Cross-Country World Cup champions
Medalists at the 2010 Winter Olympics
Medalists at the 2014 Winter Olympics
Medalists at the 2018 Winter Olympics
Tour de Ski winners
Tour de Ski skiers